James Carl France (born October 24, 1944) is an American motorsports executive. He is the chief executive officer (CEO), the chairman, and executive vice president of NASCAR, the former chief executive officer (CEO) of International Speedway Corporation (ISC) and the owner of the IMSA team Action Express Racing. Jim is the son of NASCAR founder  Bill France Sr.

Early life 
Jim France was born and raised in Daytona Beach, Florida. He graduated from Seabreeze High School and attended Florida Southern College in Lakeland, Florida and earned a business degree in 1968.

Career

NASCAR and ISC
The son of Anne Bledsoe and NASCAR co-founder William Henry Getty France, Jim France began working for his father at ISC in 1959, aged 14 years, and ultimately acceded to the ISC presidency in 1987.  With his brother Bill France Jr., he inherited control of NASCAR and ISC upon his father's death in 1992, and, as a member, and for a time secretary, of the board of directors of NASCAR, he served influentially as an advisor to his brother through the latter's retirement as NASCAR president in 2000 and as NASCAR CEO and chairman of the board in 2004; France Jr., explained in 2000 that his singular prominence notwithstanding, the two jointly guided NASCAR and ISC, joking that, "In the past, we'd have a board meeting in the hall.  My brother and I would meet and shoot the breeze for a few minutes".  Upon the accession of Brian France to the chairmanship of NASCAR in 2003, Jim France served his nephew in a similar advisory role, most significantly after the 2007 death of France Jr.

On August 6, 2018, France assumed the role of Interim CEO and Chairman of NASCAR, following the arrest of his nephew and CEO Brian France; France was arrested on suspicion of DUI in Sag Harbor, New York on August 5, 2018. With Brian taking an official leave of absence from all NASCAR duties until his legal case is resolved, the interim part of Jim's title was dropped and he became CEO and Chairman of NASCAR.

Grand American Road Racing Association
In 1999, France founded the Grand American Road Racing Association, a sanctioning body for various forms of road racing in North America, finally the governing entity for five series, including the Rolex Sports Car Series, the successor to the United States Road Racing Championship and the sponsor of the 24 Hours of Daytona; the Koni Challenge Series, a two-class touring car league; and the SunTrust Moto-ST Series, an endurance racing motorcycle series; the Association also operates the North American arm of the international Ferrari Challenge.

Worth
As of January 2023, France was estimated to be worth $1.8 billion by Forbes.

See also
France family

References

American billionaires
American chief executives of professional sports organizations
American motorsport people
Auto racing executives
Florida Southern College alumni
Grand-Am
Living people
NASCAR people
People from Daytona Beach, Florida
1944 births
Seabreeze High School alumni
France family